Roy Mayorga (born April 6, 1970) is an American musician, best known as the drummer of heavy metal bands Hellyeah and Stone Sour and is currently the drummer for the industrial metal band Ministry.

Early life 
Mayorga was born in Forest Hills, Queens, New York City, on April 6, 1970, to Cuban and Ecuadorian parents. At four years old, his family moved to Florida. While growing up, his parents would often play Motown music and rhythm and blues, which were his earliest exposures to music. He eventually became a fan of Kiss through his older brother, which led him to become interested in rock music. He began playing drums at six years old. His parents soon divorced, leading to him moving to Allentown, Pennsylvania, where he became involved in the local punk rock scene.

Career 
Mayorga formed his first band in 1985 in Allentown, called Youthquake. When Youthquake's bassist departed from the group, the remaining members formed Word Made Flesh, which Mayorga's brother eventually joined as guitarist.

Mayorga befriended the members of New York punk rock band Nausea while living in Allentown, which led to him becoming the band's drummer in 1988. The band released their debut album Extinction in 1990 through Profane Existence, which was accompanied by a European headline tour, and a tour in support of D.O.A.In the following year, the band recorded a number of songs for compilations, as well as the single "Cybergod". Additionally, the tour the U.S. west coast, with local support from Final Conflict, Neurosis, Asbestosdeath and Mindrot, before departing on a second European headline tour supported by the Radicts, however Nausea were unable to complete the final leg of the tour. In 1992, they released their final single "Lie Cycle", through Graven Image Records, before breaking up in the following months.

After Nausea's breakup, Mayorga formed Thorn with Stephan Flam and ex-Nausea guitarist John John Jesse. After their fourth live performance they signed to Roadrunner Records.

He also played with New York hardcore punk band Shelter in 1996. He also played drums on the album The Hollowing with metal band Crisis in 1996.

Mayorga formed the heavy metal band Soulfly in 1997, with former Sepultura vocalist Max Cavalera. He and Cavalera co-wrote much of the music for the band's self-titled debut album. He then departed from the band in 1999. In 2001, he rejoined the band, performing on their 2002 album 3, before leaving again in 2003 in protest of the firing of guitarist Cello Dias.

He was briefly a member of the band Medication from 1999 to 2001.

In 2004, he helped create rock band Abloom as with vocalist Jasan Radford and lead guitarist Levon Sultanian. Also part of the band was Mike Doling (Snot, Soulfly) and John Fahnestock (Snot). Fahnestock left and was replaced by Marcelo Dias a.k.a. Marcello D. Rapp (Soulfly).

In 2005, he appeared as one of the drummers on the Roadrunner United compilation CD The All-Star Sessions, playing on "The Enemy", "The End", and "Baptized in the Redemption", all tracks being produced and musically written by Dino Cazares and Roy Mayorga. The song "The End" spawned a music video.

Mayorga also does classical film scoring, working on films such as Legion (2004) and Shudder (2007).

He temporarily filled in behind the drumkit for Sepultura's 2006 European tour with In Flames following Igor Cavalera's absence.

He officially joined Stone Sour on May 10, 2006, as a replacement for Joel Ekman. He drummed for their second release, Come What(ever) May, released in August 2006. The band toured for the next year and a half, releasing the Live in Moscow album exclusively to iTunes on August 14, 2007.

Roy Mayorga played drums for Amebix during their 2009 reunion tour until they broke up again in 2012.

In October 2013, Belgian metal band Channel Zero announced that following the death of their drummer Phil Baheux.

On May 6, 2019, Mayorga was announced as Hellyeah's new drummer for their May 11, 2019, performance honoring their previous drummer Vinnie Paul. while also announcing Welcome Home as the title of their next album and that the release date was pushed back to September 27.

Personal life 
In May 2011, Mayorga suffered a stroke as a result of his frequent headbanging while drumming. The event led to him having to re-learn how to play drums.

Discography 

 1986: Youthquake – Maximum Rock and Roll Compilation
 1989: Nausea – They Don't Get Paid, They Don't Get Laid, But Boy Do They Work Hard
 1989: Nausea – Squat or Rot Volume. 1
 1990: Nausea – Extinction
 1990: Nausea – Cybergod
 1991: Nausea – More Songs About Plants and Trees
 1991: Nausea – Lie Cycle
 1992: Nausea – Discharged: From Home Front to War Front
 1993: Thorn – Bitter Potion
 1996: Crisis – The Hollowing
 1998: Soulfly – Soulfly
 2000: Dave Navarro – Trust No One
 2002: Soulfly – 3
 2004: Abloom – Abloom
 2004: Nausea – The Punk Terrorist Anthology Vol. 1 (re-release)
 2005: Roadrunner United – The All-Star Sessions
 2006: Stone Sour – Come What(ever) May
 2007: Black President – Black President
 2010: Amebix – Redux
 2010: Stone Sour – Audio Secrecy
 2011: Amebix – Knights of the Black Sun 12"
 2011: Amebix – Sonic Mass
 2012: Stone Sour – House of Gold & Bones – Part 1
 2013: Stone Sour – House of Gold & Bones – Part 2
 2014: Channel Zero – Kill All Kings
 2015: Stone Sour – Meanwhile in Burbank...  (recorded in Mayorga's personal studio in Burbank, California)
 2015: Stone Sour – Straight Outta Burbank... (recorded in Mayorga's personal studio in Burbank, California)
 2017: Stone Sour – Hydrograd
 2019: Mark Morton – Anesthetic (tracks 4, 7, 10)

Producer/Engineer credits
 1994: Chaos B.C. remix (Sepultura)
 1995: Sun to Sun (The Spitters)
 1997: Kicks Joy Darkness (Karouac)
 1997: Eye for an Eye remix (Soulfly)
 1998: Tribe remix (Soulfly)
 2012: No Rules EP (Lody Kong)

Film Score
 2004: Legion
 2007: Shudder

References

External links 

 
 Roy Mayorga: The Soulfly Interview, Drum! Magazine, December 2002
 Interview with Musicfeeds TV during the 2011 Stone Sour Australian Tour

1970 births
Living people
American people of Cuban descent
Hispanic and Latino American musicians
Stone Sour members
American heavy metal drummers
Nu metal drummers
Black President (band) members
Nausea (band) members
Soulfly members
20th-century American drummers
American male drummers
Mass Mental members
21st-century American drummers